Sebastiano Taricco (1645–1710) was an Italian painter of the Baroque period.

Taricco was born in Cherasco, a city of the Piedmont, while some claimed he studied along with Guido Reni and with Domenichino in the school of the Caracci, his lifespan indicates otherwise, and likely he was a follower of their styles or those of their followers, Carlo Francesco Nuvolone and Giovanni Peruzzini.

References

1645 births
1710 deaths
17th-century Italian painters
Italian male painters
18th-century Italian painters
Painters from Piedmont
Italian Baroque painters
People from Cherasco
18th-century Italian male artists